"Better" is a song by Australian rock band The Screaming Jets. The song was released in February 1991 as the official lead single from their debut studio album All for One (1991). The song peaked at number 4 on the ARIA Charts and was certified gold.

In January 2018, as part of Triple M's "Ozzest 100", the 'most Australian' songs of all time, "Better" was ranked number 15.

A video was also released and it shows the band members singing and playing their instruments in the outback.

Track listings
 CD Single
 "Better" - 4:40	
 "Rocket Man" - 3:22

Charts

Weekly charts

Year-end charts

Sales and certifications

Release history

References

1990 songs
1991 singles
The Screaming Jets songs